Borod is a commune in Bihor County, Crișana, Romania with a population of 3,843 people. It is composed of six villages: Borod, Borozel (Kisbáród), Cetea (Cséklye), Cornițel (Báródsomos), Șerani (Sárán) and Valea Mare de Criș (Felsőpatak).

Sights 
 Locul fosilifer de la Cornițel (Natural reserve 0,01 ha)

References

Borod
Localities in Crișana